Pennsylvania Western University, or PennWest  is a public university with campuses in California, Pennsylvania; Clarion, Pennsylvania; and Edinboro, Pennsylvania. It is part of the Pennsylvania State System of Higher Education and accredited by the Middle States Commission on Higher Education.  It was created by the merger of California University of Pennsylvania, Clarion University of Pennsylvania, and Edinboro University of Pennsylvania, and began operations as a unified university on July 1, 2022.

History

Pre-PennWest

California University of Pennsylvania was founded in 1852, when the town of California started an academy for kindergarten to college-level courses. In 1864 the school relocated to a new location, now the center of the campus' present location, the following year it was chartered as a normal school. In 1914 the Commonwealth of Pennsylvania bought the school, renamed it to  California State Normal School, and converted it to a two-year school for training elementary school teachers. In 1928 the state restored the four year programs and it became California State Teachers College. The college's offerings continued expanding through the first part of the 20th century, eventually renaming as California State College in 1959 and adding a graduate program in 1962. On 1 July 1983, the school joined the newly formed State System of Higher Education, gained university status and became California University of Pennsylvania.

Clarion University of Pennsylvania was founded in 1867 in northwestern Pennsylvania to serve the needs of that rural part of the state. It started as a Seminary and became a 'Normal School' in 1887 and a community college-level institution in 1920. Clarion became a college in 1929. In the 1960s and 1970s the college expanded its offerings and size significantly. On July 1, 1982, Clarion joined the newly formed State System of Higher Education, gained university status and became Clarion University of Pennsylvania.

Edinboro University of Pennsylvania was founded in 1857 as a training school for teachers. In 1914 it was purchased by the Commonwealth of Pennsylvania and became Edinboro State Normal School, growing its academic offers to the point it became known as Edinboro State College in 1960, and became a university in 1983 with the formation of PASSHE.

System redesign
In June 2016, under PASSHE Chancellor Frank Brogan, PASSHE began a review to identify needed changes for the long-term success of the system and its universities.  The National Center for Higher Education Management Systems (NCHEMS) was asked to conduct the review, gather data and produce a report. This report, Pennsylvania State System of Higher Education Strategic System Review Findings & Recommendations, published in July 2017, identified two critical problems: declining state funding and demographic decline, as Pennsylvania's citizens increasingly trended older. For reference Pennsylvania had what amounts to an almost 34% funding cut in dollars per student from the state. It also identified numerous issues troubling the system that were consequences of  Act 188, the law passed in 1982 that formed PASSHE.

The report concluded that the manner in which PASSHE was governed, via the Board of Governors, was increasingly unable to make decisions as its membership was increasingly politicized, concerned with the overall population of Pennsylvania, rather than needs of students and the state of Pennsylvania, and unclear authority and accountability. Also identified was a lack of collaboration within the system to coordinate post-secondary education policy. Notably, this plan stressed that there were, in its view, some options that would be ill-advised, and fail to address and possibly worsen the core issues. Among those items not recommended was "mergers of any State System institution with another that results in the loss of an individual institution's name, colors, symbols, or separate institutional accreditation."

On July 1, 2020, Act 50 of 2020 was signed into law, which granted the Board Of Governors authority to develop a procedure to "create, expand, consolidate, transfer or affiliate an institution". However, this power was restricted to only institutions that had fewer than 10,000 students in fall 2019. It also did not grant the authority to close any of the 14 institutions.  On October 14, 2020, PASSHE published Policy 2020-03: Act 50 of 2020 Implementation Policy which laid out the process for PASSHE to use their Act 50 powers. In October 2020, PASSHE started work on plans to consolidate six universities into two universities. The earliest that it was expected the planned changes could have an impact on students was semester of fall 2022.

The Political Economy Research Institute (PERI) of University of Massachusetts Amherst published a report which shared the Impacts of the PASSHE Redesign and Consolidation. The report titled "The Economic Impact of the PASSHE Employment Reeducations" highlighted how the "cuts, amounting to 14 percent of overall PASSHE employment..." and these cuts were "equivalent to the largest private-sector plant closings and mass layoffs of the previous decade in Pennsylvania."

Western Integration
On April 23, 2021, the Board of Governors approved the proposed west and northeast integration plans, and initiated a 60-day comment period. The vote was 17–2.
On April 28, 2021, a 60-day public comment period commenced, this public comment period was for both Western Integration and Northeast Integration, which was being carried out concurrently. On July 7, 2021, a revised plan was released for Western Integration. This revised plan was ultimately adopted by the Board of Governors during the July 14 meeting. This comment period saw a largely negative reaction to the proposal, with concerns raised about the impact rebranding universities would have on degrees, a lack of understanding why the six universities had been chosen over other universities in the system for merging, concerns about the increased inclusion of online classes in courses and difficulty in understanding how the proposed plan would actually correct budgetary issues in the six universities.

On July 14, 2021, the Board of Governors approved the integration plans for both west and northeast integration plans on a roll call vote with no opposition.

Formation of PennWest
On October 14, 2021, Clarion University president Dale-Elizabeth Pehrsson revealed the name for the integrated university: Pennsylvania Western University. This name was approved by the Board of Governors in voice vote with no opposition. The name was to enter use on July 1, 2022, pending approval by The Middle States Commission on Higher Education, which accredits the university. The same day, students enrolled for the fall 2021 at California, Clarion and Edinboro universities were presented with three logo designs to consider over a two-week period ending on October 22, 2021, and then select the new logo. On December 6, 2021, the new logo was revealed, with students having decided on "Design option B", featuring a compass rose design.
On March 10, 2022, Middle States Commission on Higher Education approved the plan to merge the three universities into one, under California University of Pennsylvania's accreditation, which would change its name to Pennsylvania Western University. The accreditation and state degree granting authority of Clarion University of Pennsylvania and Edinboro University of Pennsylvania would be terminated on July 1, 2022. In late April 2022, the NCAA announced that it would allow Division II sports to remain as separate teams at the three campuses and compete against each other. A select number of Division I sports are still pending a decision.
One of the aspects that set the western integration plan apart from the northeast integration was the introduction of fully online programs, citing an annual 51,000 Pennsylvania residents who enroll in out-of-state online courses. This online program would be under its own branding, distinct from the three campuses, PennWest Global Online.

Campuses

References

External links 

West Implementation Plan - PASSHE's 'System Redesign' website for the 'West Implementation Plan', which created Pennsylvania Western University.

 
 
 
Educational institutions established in 2022
Universities and colleges in Clarion County, Pennsylvania
Universities and colleges in Erie County, Pennsylvania
Universities and colleges in Venango County, Pennsylvania
Universities and colleges in Washington County, Pennsylvania
2022 establishments in Pennsylvania
Public universities and colleges in Pennsylvania